Harry William Green (31 October 1920 – 31 December 1977) was an Australian rules footballer who played with North Melbourne in the Victorian Football League (VFL).

Notes

External links 

1920 births
1977 deaths
Australian rules footballers from Victoria (Australia)
North Melbourne Football Club players